Cristel Sabrina Sandí García (born 23 January 1998) is a Costa Rican footballer who plays as a defender for Dimas Escazú and the Costa Rica women's national team.

Club career
Sandí has played for Dimas Escazú in Costa Rica.

International career
Sandí represented Costa Rica at the 2018 CONCACAF Women's U-20 Championship. She made her senior debut on 20 February 2021 in a 1–3 friendly away loss to Mexico.

References

1998 births
Living people
People from Escazú (canton)
Costa Rican women's footballers
Women's association football defenders
Costa Rica women's international footballers